Partial general elections were held in Belgium on Tuesday 11 June 1872. In the elections for the Chamber of Representatives the result was a victory for the Catholic Party, which won 71 of the 124 seats. Voter turnout was 55.5%, although only 54,933 people were eligible to vote.

Under the alternating system, elections were only held in five out of the nine provinces: Antwerp, Brabant, Luxembourg, Namur and West Flanders.

The incumbent government was a Catholic government led by Jules Malou.

Results

Chamber of Representatives

The results exclude the voting figures for the Nivelles constituency.

References

1870s elections in Belgium
General
Belgium
Belgium